Philautus bombayensis is a species of frogs in the family Rhacophoridae. It is endemic to the Western Ghats, India.

Its natural habitats are subtropical or tropical moist lowland forests, subtropical or tropical moist montane forests, subtropical or tropical moist shrubland, and heavily degraded former forest. It is threatened by habitat loss.

References

External links

bombayensis
Frogs of India
Endemic fauna of the Western Ghats
Taxa named by Nelson Annandale
Amphibians described in 1919
Taxonomy articles created by Polbot